EA-3580 is a potent anticholinergic deliriant drug with a fairly long duration of action, related to the chemical warfare agent 3-Quinuclidinyl benzilate (QNB). It was developed under contract to Edgewood Arsenal during the 1960s as part of the US military chemical weapons program, during research to improve upon the properties of earlier agents such as QNB.

EA-3580 is closely related to the similar compound EA-3443, and has similar potency and high central to peripheral effects ratio, but with a duration of action around half as long, although effects of EA-3580 can still persist for 24 hours or more following high doses.

See also 
 EA-3167
 N-methyl-3-piperidyl benzilate
 N-ethyl-3-piperidyl benzilate
 3-Quinuclidinyl benzilate
 Ditran

References 

Deliriants
Muscarinic antagonists
Incapacitating agents
Piperidines
Acetate esters
Cyclobutyl compounds
Tertiary alcohols